Jacob Bodden (September 21, 1831 – February 21, 1889) was a German American immigrant, farmer, and politician.  He represented eastern Dodge County for three terms as a member of the Wisconsin State Assembly.

Biography
Bodden was born in Lich, which was, at the time, a part of the Rhine Province of the Kingdom of Prussia (modern day Germany). In 1851, Bodden immigrated to Wisconsin and worked as a farmer. On January 24, 1856, Bodden married Agnes Schafer. On September 3, 1858, Schafer died after giving birth to their only child. In 1860, Bodden married Gertrude Schaefer at the Catholic church in Theresa, Wisconsin. They had 13 children. He died on February 21, 1889, in Theresa.

Career
Bodden served in the Wisconsin State Assembly during the 1861, 1866, and 1874 sessions and was a Democrat. He also served as treasurer and sheriff of Dodge County, Wisconsin. He also was chairman of the county board of supervisors of Dodge County in 1874–75. In 1873, Bodden ran for the state assembly unopposed and received 902 total votes.

Descendants
In 1988, Jacob Bodden's great-grandson, Todd Bodden, ran for Wisconsin's 59th Assembly district as a Democrat and lost in the general election.

In 2022, Jacob Bodden's 3rd great-grandson, Ty Bodden of Stockbridge, Wisconsin, was elected to the Assembly in the 59th Assembly district, running as a Republican.  He had previously run unsuccessfully for the Republican nomination in this district in 2018. Like his 3rd great-grandfather, Ty Bodden is a former resident of Theresa, Wisconsin. Ty also used to reside in St. Cloud, Wisconsin, Fond du Lac, Wisconsin and Kewaskum, Wisconsin. He currently resides in Stockbridge, Wisconsin.

References

1831 births
1889 deaths
People from Theresa, Wisconsin
German emigrants to the United States
Wisconsin sheriffs
County supervisors in Wisconsin
19th-century American politicians
Democratic Party members of the Wisconsin State Assembly